Abdelali Ouadah (born 15 April 1988) is a French professional footballer who plays as a right-back for Rouen.

Career
Ouadah began his senior career with Roye, and had a stint with the reserves of Amiens. His early career was mostly in the semi-pro leagues of France with Avion, Ailly, Oissel and Rodez. He moved to Algeria with USM El Harrach and O Médéa from 2017 to 2017. He made his professional debut with USM El Harrach in a 2–1 Algerian Ligue Professionnelle 1 win over MC Alger on 27 August 2016. In the summer of 2017, he returned to France with Rouen.

Personal life
Born in France, Ouadah is of Algerian descent. His brother, Mohamed Ouadah, is also a professional footballer.

References

External links
 
 Foot-National profile
 FC Rouen Profile

1988 births
Living people
People from Louviers
French footballers
French sportspeople of Algerian descent
Association football fullbacks
Amiens SC players
CS Avion players
Rodez AF players
USM El Harrach players
FC Rouen players
Algerian Ligue Professionnelle 1 players
Championnat National 2 players
Championnat National 3 players
Sportspeople from Eure
Footballers from Normandy